Luxora is a city in Mississippi County, Arkansas, United States. The population was 942 at the 2020 census, down from 1,178 in 2010.

Geography
Luxora is located in eastern Mississippi County at  (35.756954, -89.929616). It is bordered to the southeast by the Tennessee state line, which follows a side channel of the Mississippi River. U.S. Route 61 passes through the northwest side of the city, leading north  to Blytheville and southwest  to Osceola.

Demographics

2020 census

As of the 2020 United States census, there were 942 people, 358 households, and 200 families residing in the city.

2010 census
As of the 2010 United States Census, there were 1,178 people living in the town. The racial makeup of the town was 60.8% Black, 33.1% White, 0.5% Native American and 1.0% from two or more races. 4.6% were Hispanic or Latino of any race.

2000 census
At the 2000 census, there were 1,317 people, 477 households and 352 families living in the town.  The population density was 584.5/km (1,514.5/mi2). There were 537 housing units at an average density of 238.3/km (617.5/mi2). The racial makeup of the town was 40.93% White, 56.04% Black or African American, 0.08% Native American, 1.97% from other races, and 0.99% from two or more races. 2.73% of the population were Hispanic or Latino of any race.

There were 477 households, of which 38.6% had children under the age of 18 living with them, 43.0% were married couples living together, 26.0% had a female householder with no husband present, and 26.0% were non-families. 23.9% of all households were made up of individuals, and 11.1% had someone living alone who was 65 years of age or older. The average household size was 2.76 and the average family size was 3.29.

Age distribution was 34.8% under the age of 18, 7.6% from 18 to 24, 24.8% from 25 to 44, 21.1% from 45 to 64, and 11.7% who were 65 years of age or older. The median age was 31 years. For every 100 females, there were 87.1 males.  For every 100 females age 18 and over, there were 78.2 males.

The median household income was $20,304, and the median family income was $23,906. Males had a median income of $22,375 versus $18,698 for females. The per capita income for the town was $9,060. About 30.7% of families and 32.4% of the population were below the poverty line, including 37.7% of those under age 18 and 30.3% of those age 65 or over.

Education 
Public education for elementary and secondary students is provided by the Rivercrest School District (formerly the Southern Mississippi County School District), which includes the Southern Mississippi County Elementary School at Luxora (prekindergarten through grade 4).  Students graduate from Rivercrest High School located near Wilson.

On July 1, 1986, the Luxora School District consolidated into the Southern Mississippi County School District.

References

Cities in Mississippi County, Arkansas
Arkansas populated places on the Mississippi River
Cities in Arkansas